Hurstbourne Priors is a small village and civil parish in the Basingstoke and Deane district of Hampshire, England. Its nearest town is Whitchurch, which lies approximately 1.8 miles (3.1 km) north-east from the village.

The church of St Andrew the Apostle is the oldest existing church in the Diocese of Winchester.

In the churchyard is the grave of noted Irish baritone Harry Plunket Greene (1865-1936), as well as those of his two sons Richard (born 1901) and David (born 1904). Finnish industrialist and diplomat Ossian Donner is also buried in the churchyard.

References

Villages in Hampshire
Civil parishes in Basingstoke and Deane